Bicyclus condamini, the ebony bush brown, is a butterfly in the family Nymphalidae. It is found in eastern Zimbabwe. The habitat consists of montane forests.

Adults are on wing year round, with a peak in August, September and December. There are distinct seasonal forms.

References

Elymniini
Butterflies described in 1963
Endemic fauna of Zimbabwe
Butterflies of Africa